Spirit of Tasmania is best known as the trading name of TT-Line (Australia).

It can also refer to the following ferries that have been operated by the business at some time during their careers:

 Spirit of Tasmania - serviced the Devonport-Melbourne route, 1994-2002 - now known as  
 Spirit of Tasmania I - in service, Devonport-Melbourne, 2002-present
 Spirit of Tasmania II - in service, Devonport-Melbourne, 2002-present
 Spirit of Tasmania III - serviced the Devonport-Sydney route, 2003-2006 - now known as 
 Spirit of Tasmania IV - to commence service in 2023
 Spirit of Tasmania V - to commence service in 2024

Ship names